Gunnar Olof "Hacke" Björksten (February 17, 1934 in Helsinki – December 17, 2020 in Stockholm) was a Finnish-Swedish jazz bandleader and saxophonist.

Hacke Björksten lived in Finland until 1945, when his parents moved to Sweden; he gained his first break as a teenager in 's band in Gothenburg. In 1954, he founded his own ensemble in Stockholm, which included trombonist Åke Persson, pianist , and vibraphonist Kurt Weil as sidemen; this band was active through the end of the decade. He played less frequently in the 1960s, but returned to recording in the 1970s and 1980s, including with Mel Lewis and Ulf Johansson.

Discography
Please note this list is incomplete.
 2004 — Hacke Björksten Quintet – Three Generations, Dragon (8) – DRCD 397
 2014 — Hacke Björksten, Ulf Johansson Werre, Hans Backenroth – Top Three, Do Music Records – DMRCD 023

References
Footnotes

General references
"Hacke Björksten". The New Grove Dictionary of Jazz. 2nd edition, ed. Barry Kernfeld

External links

1934 births
2020 deaths
Swedish jazz bandleaders
Swedish jazz saxophonists
Male saxophonists
Musicians from Helsinki
Swedish people of Finnish descent
21st-century saxophonists
21st-century Swedish male musicians
Male jazz musicians
20th-century saxophonists